The 2017 Atlanta Blaze season was the second season for the Atlanta Blaze of Major League Lacrosse and David Huntley's first full season as head coach after taking over for John Tucker ten games into 2016. The Blaze posted two more wins in 2017, finishing their second season at 6-8 and eighth place in the standings.

On December 29, 2016, former Atlanta Hawks and Thrashers executive Jim Pfeifer was named the team's new president. In April 2017, the team’s owner Peter Trematerra sued the MLL for misinterpretations from when he bought the league in 2014.

Schedule

Regular season

Standings

References

External links
 Team Website

Major League Lacrosse seasons
Atlanta Blaze
Atlanta Blaze